James or Jim Eadie may refer to: 
 James Eadie (brewer), Scottish brewer
 Sir James Eadie (barrister), British barrister
 James Eadie (footballer), Scottish footballer
 Jim Eadie (footballer), Scottish footballer
 Jim Eadie (politician), Scottish politician